On the Sly: In Search of the Family Stone is a documentary about Sly Stone, his absence from the music scene, and one man's quest to find out what happened to the artist. It is directed by Michael Rubenstone.

Background
The film is about a quest to find the reclusive Sly. According to a 2005 Rolling Stone article by Andrew Paine Bradbury, Michael Rubenstone,  Greg Zola, and indie One-Four Productions were in their second year of their project.<ref>Rolling Stone - Sly Stone Joins Family By Andrew Paine Bradbury</ref> In a Washington Post'' article, in reference to Stone's absence, one of the filmmakers compared him to J. D. Salinger. Through a period of about 12 years, band members, people in the music industry and other musicians were interviewed. One of the people to appear in the film is Cornel West. He talks about Stone's biggest hit songs and the effect they had on him.

After 13 years and going through 500 hours of footage the film was completed. It appears that the final product as well as the majority of the work, and final completion is due to the efforts by Michael Rubenstone with a new production company, Unreal films.

Premiere
The film premiered at the 2017 Slamdance Film Festival.

Cast 

 Rusty Allen
 Frank Arellano 
 Hamp 'Bubba' Banks 
 Dick Cavett
 Clive Davis  
 Gordon DeWitty  
 Greg Errico
 David Froelich  
 George Johnson  
 Jeff Kaliss  
 David Kapralik
 Michaell Lang
 Jerry Martini 
 Alec Palao 
 
 Stephen Paley 
 Pat Rizzo
 Cynthia Robinson
 Rich Romanello  
 Michael Rubenstone 
 Joel Selvin
 Paul Shaffer
 Vet Stone
 Quincy Troupe  
 John Turk   
 Michael Wadleigh
 Cornel West
 Bobby Womack

References

External links
 ON THE SLY: Website
 Imdb: On the Sly: In Search of the Family Stone

Films about Sly Stone
Sly and the Family Stone
Documentary films about music and musicians
2010s English-language films